Bruce Brown may refer to:

Bruce Brown (basketball) (born 1996), American basketball player
Bruce Brown (director) (1937–2017), American documentary filmmaker

Bruce Brown (footballer) (born 1951), Australian rules footballer
Bruce Alan Brown (fl. 1970s–2010s), American musicologist